Laurence Gatenby (10 April 1889 – 14 January 1917) was an Australian cricketer. He played two first-class matches for Tasmania between 1913 and 1914. He was killed in action during World War I.

See also
 List of Tasmanian representative cricketers
 List of cricketers who were killed during military service

References

External links
 

1889 births
1917 deaths
Australian cricketers
Tasmania cricketers
Cricketers from Tasmania
Australian military personnel killed in World War I